Ellen Louise Demorest (née Curtis) (November 15, 1824 – August 10, 1898) was a US fashion arbiter. She was a successful milliner, widely credited for inventing mass-produced tissue-paper dressmaking patterns. With her husband, William Jennings Demorest, she established a company to sell the patterns, which were adaptations of the latest French fashions, and a magazine to promote them (1860).  Her dressmaking patterns made French styles accessible to ordinary women, thus greatly influencing US fashion.

Early life 
Demorest was born November 15, 1824, in Schuylerville, New York.  She was the second of eight children born to Electra Abel Curtis and Henry D. Curtis.  Her father was a farmer and the owner of a men's hat factory.  At eighteen, Demorest set up a millinery shop in Saratoga Springs with the help of her father.  After a year, she moved her business to Troy before relocating again to Williamsburg, Brooklyn. In 1858, she married William Jennings Demorest, a thirty-six year old widower with two children.  Demorest gave birth to a son in 1859 and a daughter in 1865.

Career
Early in their marriage, the Demorests ran a Philadelphia emporium.  Ellen and her sister Kate were working on a system of simplified dress making when they saw the Demorest's African-American maid cutting a dress pattern out of brown paper.  Ellen was inspired by the idea to create tissue paper patterns of fashionable garments for the home sewer.

The family relocated to New York and began manufacturing patterns.  In the fall of 1860, they launched a quarterly magazine, Mme. Demorest’s Mirror of Fashions. They also opened a women's fashion emporium at 473 Broadway.

Mme. Demorest’s Mirror of Fashions and Demorest’s Illustrated Monthly Magazine soon reached a circulation of 60,000.  The magazine was well-timed, coming as sewing machines became common in middle-class homes.  Articles in the Mirror of Fashions gave home sewers helpful tips and encouraged readers to believe in their own ability.  Readers felt "emancipated... from dependence on milliners and dressmakers."

The fashions worn by Empress Eugenie were of particular interest to the readers of Demorest’s Illustrated Monthly Magazine and Mme. Demorest’s Mirror of Fashions.  Correspondents reported on every dress the Empress wore and her gowns were reproduced for a semi-annual New York show.

Journalist and women's rights advocate Jane Cunningham Croly edited Demorest’s Illustrated Monthly Magazine from 1860 to 1887.  Under her leadership, Demorest’s Monthly advocated for female education and employment. Croly promoted female accomplishment with a monthly "What Women Are Doing" column. The column claimed to take "note of every woman rancher, banker, dentist or businesswoman... who came to light in a distinctive way in any part of the country."  Other contributors included Louisa May Alcott, Theodore Dreiser, and Robert Louis Stevenson.

In 1863, Ellen designed the wedding trousseau of circus performer Lavinia Warren.

In 1876, the year of their height in popularity, the Demorests' company distributed and sold over 3 million patterns.  Offices in Europe, Canada and Cuba distributed Demorest patterns.

An ardent abolitionist and women's rights advocate, Ellen Demorest employed both black and white women in her enterprises. Those who objected to her politics were asked to shop elsewhere.

Later life 
In 1876, Demorest turned her attention to philanthropy.  Along with Jane Cunningham Croly, Ellen was a founding member of Sorosis, the first professional women's club in the United States.

Ironically, the Demorests failed to patent their paper pattern but another inventor, Ebenezer Butterick, did. Initially Butterick confined his patterns to men's and children's wear, but by 1867 he expanded to women's patterns as well. By 1874 his empire extended from Europe to North America with over 100 branch offices. It remains the center of the paper pattern industry today.

Magazines published
 Demorest’s Illustrated Monthly Magazine
 Mme. Demorest’s Mirror of Fashions.

Family history
Ellen Louise Demorest (née Curtis) was born November 15, 1824, at old Saratoga, otherwise known as Schuylerville, New York.  She was the second of eight children (6 girls 2 boys) born to Henry D. Curtis and Electa Curtis, née Abel.  She was known from girlhood as Nell.

One of her father's eighteen siblings — Charity — (1834–1919, married to Jeremiah Shonts) was the maternal grandmother of Charles B.J. Snyder, a renowned American architect who served as Superintendent of School Buildings for the New York City Board of Education from 1891 to 1923.

Ellen became the second wife of William Jennings Demorest, a widower, and a stepmother to the two children born to his first marriage:  (i) Vienna Willamina Demorest (1847–1913) — who married Dr. James M. Gano (1842–1895) and Henry Clay Demorest (1850–1928).  Two more children were born to Ellen Louise Demorest and W. Jennings Demorest: (iii) William Curtis Demorest (1859–1933) and (iv) Evelyn Celeste Caradora Louise Demorest (1865–1960) — who married Alexander Garretson Rea (d. 1926) of Philadelphia.

References

External links

1825 births
1898 deaths
American fashion journalists
American milliners
19th-century American inventors
American magazine founders
19th-century American businesspeople
19th-century American businesswomen